Before the World Set on Fire is an upcoming American drama film directed and written by Jaclyn Bethany. The film stars Joe Adler, Mary Neely, David Call, Brooke Bloom, Eve Connolly and Julia Sarah Stone.

Cast
 Joe Adler as Kasper
Mary Neely as Molly
 David Call as Cole
 Brooke Bloom as Anya
 Eve Connolly as Mara
 Julia Sarah Stone as Hanna
 Stephen Friedrich as Vlad
 Alex Hurt as Reed

Production
Principal photography began on July 1, 2020 and concluded on August 1, 2020.

References

External links
 

American drama films
Films about the COVID-19 pandemic
Upcoming English-language films
Upcoming films